Bradley is an unincorporated community and census-designated place (CDP) in Monterey County, California, on the Salinas River  south-southeast of San Ardo and  north of Paso Robles. The population was 69 at the 2020 census, down from 93 at the 2010 census.

History
The Southern Pacific Railroad reached Bradley in 1886, and a post office was established the same year. The name honors Bradley V. Sargent, who owned the land on which the railway station was built.

Geography
It is accessible from Exit 252 on U.S. Route 101, which leads northwest  to Salinas, the Monterey county seat, and south  to San Luis Obispo. 

Climate
This region experiences warm and dry summers, with no average monthly temperatures below 71.6 °F.  According to the Köppen Climate Classification system, Bradley has a warm-summer Mediterranean climate, abbreviated "Csb" on climate maps.

Demographics

2010
At the 2010 census Bradley had a population of 93. The racial makeup of Bradley was 85 (91.4%) White, 0 (0.0%) African American, 2 (2.2%) Native American, 0 (0.0%) Asian, 0 (0.0%) Pacific Islander, 5 (5.4%) from other races, and 1 (1.1%) from two or more races. Hispanic or Latino of any race were 11 people (11.8%).

The whole population lived in households, no one lived in non-institutionalized group quarters and no one was institutionalized.

There were 37 households, 14 (37.8%) had children under the age of 18 living in them, 21 (56.8%) were opposite-sex married couples living together, 3 (8.1%) had a female householder with no husband present, 3 (8.1%) had a male householder with no wife present.  There were 3 (8.1%) unmarried opposite-sex partnerships, and 0 (0%) same-sex married couples or partnerships. 8 households (21.6%) were one person and 1 (2.7%) had someone living alone who was 65 or older. The average household size was 2.51.  There were 27 families (73.0% of households); the average family size was 2.85.

The age distribution was 22 people (23.7%) under the age of 18, 5 people (5.4%) aged 18 to 24, 24 people (25.8%) aged 25 to 44, 33 people (35.5%) aged 45 to 64, and 9 people (9.7%) who were 65 or older.  The median age was 39.8 years. For every 100 females, there were 111.4 males.  For every 100 females age 18 and over, there were 121.9 males.

There were 40 housing units at an average density of 465.1 per square mile, of the occupied units 16 (43.2%) were owner-occupied and 21 (56.8%) were rented. The homeowner vacancy rate was 0%; the rental vacancy rate was 4.5%.  38 people (40.9% of the population) lived in owner-occupied housing units and 55 people (59.1%) lived in rental housing units.

2000
At the 2000 census there were 120 people, 40 households, and 29 families in the CDP. The racial makeup of the CDP was 74.17% White, 0.83% Native American, 23.33% from other races, and 1.67% from two or more races. 23.33% of the population were Hispanic or Latino of any race.
Of the 40 households 42.5% had children under the age of 18 living with them, 52.5% were married couples living together, 15.0% had a female householder with no husband present, and 27.5% were non-families. 17.5% of households were one person and 2.5% were one person aged 65 or older. The average household size was 3.00 and the average family size was 3.38.

The age distribution was 32.5% under the age of 18, 10.8% from 18 to 24, 32.5% from 25 to 44, 14.2% from 45 to 64, and 10.0% 65 or older. The median age was 30 years. For every 100 females, there were 100.0 males. For every 100 females age 18 and over, there were 102.5 males.

The median household income was $48,000 and the median family income  was $46,250. Males had a median income of $35,833 versus $13,750 for females. The per capita income for the CDP was $15,344. There were 11.1% of families and 19.0% of the population living below the poverty line, including 32.4% of under eighteens and none of those over 64.

Culture
Bradley is the closest community to the Lightning in a Bottle Music Festival, which is held  to the west at Lake San Antonio.

Bradley School hosts the lunch for "day 3" of the Aids/LifeCycle each year in which 3,500 riders, from around the world and all walks of life, come through town.

References

Census-designated places in Monterey County, California
Salinas Valley
Unincorporated communities in Monterey County, California
Unincorporated communities in California